Aristotelia iospora is a moth of the family Gelechiidae. It was described by Edward Meyrick in 1929. It is found in North America, where it has been recorded from Texas.

The wingspan is 11–12 mm. The forewings are grey irrorated (sprinkled) with violet whitish, the costa narrowly violet white from about one-fourth to three-fourths and with a fine black line on the fold from the base to one-fourth, sometimes edged white below. There is a slender slightly interrupted black median streak from near the base to beyond the middle. The plical and second discal stigmata are black and there are some fine irregular black marks towards the costa from near the base to beyond the middle, others towards the apex, and several towards the dorsum. The hindwings are grey.

References

Moths described in 1929
Aristotelia (moth)
Moths of North America